The one-electron universe postulate, proposed by theoretical physicist John Wheeler in a telephone call to Richard Feynman in the spring of 1940, is the hypothesis that all electrons and positrons are actually manifestations of a single entity moving backwards and forwards in time. According to Feynman:

A similar "zigzag world line description of pair annihilation" has been independently devised by E. C. G. Stueckelberg at the same time.

Overview
The idea is based on the world lines traced out across spacetime by every electron. Rather than have myriad such lines, Wheeler suggested that they could all be parts of one single line like a huge tangled knot, traced out by the one electron. Any given moment in time is represented by a slice across spacetime, and would meet the knotted line a great many times. Each such meeting point represents a real electron at that moment.

At those points, half the lines will be directed forward in time and half will have looped round and be directed backwards. Wheeler suggested that these backwards sections appeared as the antiparticle to the electron, the positron.

Many more electrons have been observed than positrons, and electrons are thought to comfortably outnumber them. According to Feynman he raised this issue with Wheeler, who speculated that the missing positrons might be hidden within protons.

Feynman was struck by Wheeler's insight that antiparticles could be represented by reversed world lines, and credits this to Wheeler, saying in his Nobel speech:

Feynman later proposed this interpretation of the positron as an electron moving backward in time in his 1949 paper "The Theory of Positrons".  Yoichiro Nambu later applied it to all production and annihilation of particle-antiparticle pairs, stating that "the eventual creation and annihilation of pairs that may occur now and then, is no creation nor annihilation, but only a change of directions of moving particles, from past to future, or from future to past."

See also 
 Identical particles
 Eddington number
 T-symmetry

References

External links

Thought experiments in quantum mechanics
Quantum electrodynamics
1940 in science
Physical cosmology
Conceptual models
Richard Feynman
Electron